Ralph Jacobus Fairbanks (December 26, 1857 – October 3, 1943) was an American prospector, entrepreneur, and pioneer who established several towns in the Death Valley area of California, including Fairbanks Springs (1904–05), Shoshone (1910), and Baker (1929).

Early life 
Fairbanks was born to Mormon pioneer parents David and Susan Mandeville Fairbanks in Payson, Utah, on December 26, 1857.

Career 
He was a descendant of Jonathan Fairbanks. He followed a job with the railroad at start of the 20th century south to Las Vegas, Nevada, and eventually moved his family to Death Valley.

Earlier in 1883, Fairbanks had been among those called by John Taylor to start a new settlement in the Sevier Valley.

R. J. "Dad" Fairbanks, as he was known to locals, built businesses and towns throughout the region and built the first Standard Oil service station in the area, in Baker. He was known for saving tourists and prospectors who wandered into the desert, and also recovered bodies of unlucky travelers.

Personal life 
He married Celestia Adelaide Johnson in 1877 and had eleven children. Only eight survived to adulthood.

When Fairbanks was in his 70s, he moved to Santa Paula, California, with his wife Celeste to live with their youngest daughter, Zella Modine, and her family. Celeste died in 1938 and Ralph moved to Hollywood, California, with Zella and granddaughter Nola Fairbanks. Ralph died on October 3, 1943 at the Hollywood Nursing Home. His great-grandson is actor Matthew Modine.

Though his parents and wife were Members of the church of Jesus Christ of Latter-Day Saints, Fairbanks was never a devout member of the religion.

References

External links
Story about "Dad" Fairbanks & Death Valley Scotty in the Pahrump Times
Photos of Ralph on the Nola Fairbanks Web Site
Story about "Dad" in the Desert Dispatch
Shoshone, CA
"Dad" Fairbanks cabins at Baker, CA (1931)

American prospectors
American people of English descent
American city founders
1857 births
1942 deaths
Death Valley
History of the Mojave Desert region
People from Payson, Utah